This is a list of officeholders of Port Macquarie-Hastings Council and its predecessors, a local government area of New South Wales, Australia.

The Mayor of the Port Macquarie-Hastings Council since 4 August 2017 is Cr. Peta Pinson, an independent politician.

Mayors, Shire Presidents and General Managers

Municipality of Port Macquarie, 1887–1980

Hastings Shire, 1906–1980

Hastings/Port Macquarie-Hastings, 1980–date

General Managers

References

Port Macquarie-Hastings
Port Macquarie